Ushanandini (Malayalam: ഉഷാ നന്ദിനി) is an Indian actress in South Indian movies. She was a prominent lead actress during the 1970s in Malayalam films. She had acted in Tamil films as well.

Biography
Ushanandini was born as Usha Devi to parents K. G. Raman Pillai and Saraswathi in 1949 at Kamaleshwaram, Thiruvananthapuram, Kerala. She has a Bachelor of Arts degree. She made her Malayalam debut in 1967 with Aval, a great success at the box office. She had acted as heroine to Sivaji Ganesan in many Tamil movies like Ponnunjal, Gowravam, Rajapart Rangadurai, Manithanum Deivamagalam and Ennai Pol Oruvan. Nagarame Nandi, Olavum Theeravum, Aa Chithrasalabham Parannotte are the few among the important characters she played.

She is married to a successful business magnate, S. Mariappan. She has three daughters, Preethi, Sajni and Keerthana. She also has had two granddaughters named Diya Tanushree and Tara Devi.

Partial filmography

Malayalam
Yakshagaanam (1976)
Criminals (Kayangal) (1975)
Sathyathinte Nizhalil  (1975)
Pattaabhishekam (1974)
Check Post (1974)
Ashwathi (1974)
Police Ariyaruthu (1973)
Periyar (1973)
Kaamuki (1971)
Makane Ninakku Vendi (1971)....Mary
Jalakanyaka (1971)
Aa Chithrashalabham Parannotte (1970)
Olavum Theeravum (1970)
Padunna Puzha (1968)
Aval (1967)
Nagarame Nandi (1967)

Tamil
Malathi (1970) as Chandra
Veettukku Oru Pillai (1971) as Ponni
Shakthi Leelai (1972) as Lord Parvathi
Ponnunjal (1973) as Valli
Gauravam (1973) as Radha
Rajapart Rangadurai (1973) as Alamel
Ponvandu (1973) as Sathyabama
Athaiya Mamiya (1974) as Usha
Thaai Veetu Seedhanam (1975)
Manidhanum Dheivamagalam (1975) as Vijaya
Ennai Pol Oruvan (1978) as Usha

References

Sources

External links

Ushanandini at MSI

Actresses in Malayalam cinema
Indian film actresses
Actresses from Thiruvananthapuram
Actresses in Tamil cinema
Living people
1949 births
20th-century Indian actresses